Thwaitesia margaritifera is a species of spider of the genus Thwaitesia. It is found in China, India, Sri Lanka and Vietnam.

See also
 List of Theridiidae species

References

Theridiidae
Spiders of Asia
Spiders described in 1881